Vajs is a surname. Notable people with the surname include:

 Jozef Vajs (born 1997), Slovak footballer
 Miroslav Vajs (born 1979), Macedonian footballer
 Roman Vajs (born 1974), Slovakian slalom canoer